Banksia gardneri, commonly known as prostrate banksia,  is a species of prostrate shrub that is endemic to Western Australia. It has pinnatipartite or serrated leaves, usually rusty brown flowers, and up to twenty-five elliptical follicles in each fruiting head. It occurs along the west part of the south coast of the state.

Description
Banksia gardneri is a prostrate shrub that forms a lignotuber and has hairy stems that usually lie on the surface. The flowers are usually rusty brown with a cream-coloured style.

Taxonomy and naming
Prostrate banksia was first formally described in 1830 by Robert Brown who gave it the name Banksia prostrata, but the name was illegitimate because it was already in use (Banksia prostrata J.R.Forst. & G.Forst.) for a New Zealand endemic now known as Pimelea prostrata (J.R.Forst. & G.Forst.) Lam. In 1981, Alex George described the species in the journal Nuytsia, giving it the name Banksia gardneri. The specific epithet honours Charles Gardner, the Government Botanist of Western Australia from 1929 to 1960.

In the same journal, George described three varieties and the names are accepted by the Australian Plant Census:
 Banksia gardneri var. brevidentata that has serrated leaves;
 Banksia gardneri var. gardneri that has pinnatipartite leaves and rusty brown flowers mainly in spring;
 Banksia gardneri var. hiemalis that has pinnatipartite leaves and pale pink and pale brown flowers, mainly in winter.

Distribution and habitat
Banksia gardneri grows in shrubland, low woodland and kwongan, mainly between Cranbrook, Ravensthorpe, Harrismith and the south coast of Western Australia.

Conservation status
This banksia is classified as "not threatened" by the Western Australian Government Department of Parks and Wildlife.

References

gardneri
Eudicots of Western Australia
Endemic flora of Western Australia
Plants described in 1981
Taxa named by Alex George